Dibenzoxepin, or dibenz[b,e]oxepin, is a tricyclic compound. It is the parent structure of certain drugs such as the tricyclic antidepressant doxepin and the analgesic fluradoline. The former is the only tricyclic antidepressant that is a dibenzoxepin.

See also
 Dibenzazepine
 Dibenzocycloheptene
 Dibenzothiepin
 Dibenzothiazepine

References

Dibenzoxepins